Leona Josefa Florentino (19 April 1849 – 4 October 1884) was a Filipina poet who wrote in Spanish and Ilocano.  She is considered as the "mother of Philippine women's literature," serving as the "bridge from oral to literary tradition"; and as a pioneer in Philippine lesbian literature.

Born to a wealthy and prominent family in Vigan, Ilocos Sur, Florentino was baptized under the Christian name Leona Josefa Florentina. She began to write her first verses in Ilocano at a young age. Despite her potential, she was not allowed to receive a university education because of her gender. Florentino was instead tutored by her mother, and then a series of private teachers. An educated Ilocano priest taught her advanced Spanish and encouraged her to develop her voice in poetry.

Florentino married a politician named Elías de los Reyes at the age of 14. They had five children together. Their eldest son Isabelo de los Reyes later became a Filipino writer, activist and senator. Due to the protofeminist nature of her writings, Florentino was shunned by her husband and son; she lived alone in exile and separately from her family. She died of tuberculosis at the age of 35.

Works
Her lyrical poetry in Spanish, and especially that in Ilocano, gained attention in various international forums in Spain, Paris and St. Louis, Missouri. Her literary contributions - particularly 22 preserved poems - were recognized when she was included in the Encyclopedia Internationale des Oeuvres des Femmes (International Encyclopedia of Women’s Works) in 1889.  She is believed to be the first Filipina to receive this international recognition, an homage that occurred after her death at a young age.  Her work was exhibited at the Exposition Filipina in Madrid in 1887 and at the Exposition Internationale in Paris in 1889.

References

1849 births
1884 deaths
Proto-feminists
Filipino feminists
19th-century Filipino poets
Filipino people of Chinese descent
Filipino people of Spanish descent
Spanish-language poets
Ilocano people
Filipino women poets
People from Vigan
19th-century Filipino writers
19th-century Filipino women writers
Spanish-language writers of the Philippines